A circaseptan rhythm  is a cycle consisting of approximately 7 days in which many biological processes of life, such as cellular immune system activity, resolve.

See also
Circadian rhythm
Chronobiology

References

Further reading 

 Halberg F et al. 1965: "Spectral resolution of low-frequency, small-amplitude rhythms in excreted 17-ketosteroid: probable androgen-induced circaseptan desynchronization". Acta Endocrinol. Suppl. 103, 5-54
 Kaiser H, Cornelissen G, Halberg F 1990: "Palaeochronobiology circadian rhythms, gauges of adaptive Darwinian evolution: about 7-day circaseptan rhythms, gauges of integrative evolution". In: Chronobiology - its role in clinical medicine (eds. Hayes DK, Pauly JE, Reiter RJ) Wiley-Liss Inc., New York, pp. 755–762
 
 Uezono K et al. 1987: Circaseptan rhythm in sodium and potassium excretion in salt-sensitive and salt-resistant 'Dahl rats'". Progr Clin Biol Res 227A, 297-307

Circadian rhythm
Weeks